The Mitchell–Ward House is a historic house at 201 North Nelson in Gentry, Arkansas.  Its main block is an L-shaped wood-frame structure, with a cross-gable roof, and a large gable above the porch in the crook of the L.  The three front-facing gable ends have decorative Folk Victorian jigsawn trim and different styles of siding, and the porch features turned posts, a spindled balustrade, and a decorative frieze.  The interior has also retained all of its original woodwork.  The house was built in 1897, and is one of the finest Queen Anne/Folk Victorian houses in the city.

The house was listed on the National Register of Historic Places in 2005.

See also
Mitchell House (Gentry, Arkansas)
National Register of Historic Places listings in Benton County, Arkansas

References

Houses on the National Register of Historic Places in Arkansas
Victorian architecture in Arkansas
Houses completed in 1897
Houses in Benton County, Arkansas
National Register of Historic Places in Benton County, Arkansas
Queen Anne architecture in Arkansas
1897 establishments in Arkansas
Gentry, Arkansas